Haymaker is the third full-length release by American band Throwdown. The album involves guest vocals from Scott Vogel from Terror and Chad Gilbert from New Found Glory.

Track listing

Personnel 
Throwdown
 Dave Peters – vocals, assistant producer
 Keith Barney – guitar
 Tommy Love – guitar
 Dom Macaluso – bass, assistant producer
 Jarrod Alexander – drums

Guest artists and collaborations
 Chad Gilbert – guest vocals (New Found Glory and Shai Hulud)
 Scott Vogel – guest vocals (Terror and Buried Alive)
 Scott Bradford – legal advisor
 Kirk Catlin – lyric adaptations
 Three Daves and a Kirk (Three channels of Dave Peters and one of Kirk Catlin) – backing vocals

Image and layout
 Jeff Gros – photography
 Dave McDermott – booking (New Zealand For Dynamo Productions)
 Graham Nixon – booking (Australia For Resist Booking)
 Matt Pike – booking (U.S. For The Kenmore Agency)

Production
 Gene Grimaldi – mastering
 Greg Koller – producer, engineer
 Dave Peters – producer (assistant producer)
 Dom Macaluso – producer (assistant producer)

Vinyl 
Haymaker was pressed on vinyl in 2003 by Trustkill Records and re-pressed in 2008 as a double LP with Vendetta.

References

2003 albums
Throwdown (band) albums
Trustkill Records albums